This was the first edition of the tournament.

Antonio Šančić and Artem Sitak won the title after defeating Romain Arneodo and Manuel Guinard 7–6(7–5), 6–4 in the final.

Seeds

Draw

References

External links
 Main draw

Saint-Tropez Open - Doubles